The Adventures of Sam was an Australian children's animated television serial, written by Ken Kelso, that aired on the ABC in 1999. Set in the 1850s, it followed a sea-faring boy named Sam Donahue as he goes on many adventures around the world while trying to find his brother Tom and discovers new worlds and different cultures.

The show ran for 13 episodes and is produced by the Australian Film Finance Corporation and Southern Star Entertainment in association with the ABC. It was also well known for its theme music by Nerida Tyson-Chew which was nominated for several awards. The show was also released on three videos in 1999 by PolyGram Video each containing four episodes featuring all episodes except for the final episode "Begin Again". It also aired on Toon Disney and The Disney Channel in the United Kingdom, TV2 in New Zealand, Kids Central in Singapore, Arutz HaYeladim in Israel, K-T.V. World in South Africa, France 5 in France, Disney Channel in Malaysia and RTÉ2 in Ireland being shown on the long running children's block The Den.

Episode listing
 1. Escape (29/01/1999)
 2. Moon Daughter (05/02/1999)
 3. The Forbidden City (12/02/1999)
 4. Fire On The Water (19/02/1999)
 5. Sea Raiders (26/02/1999)
 6. Jungle Ghost (05/03/1999)
 7. The Sultan's Palace (12/03/1999)
 8. The Queen's Move (19/03/1999)
 9. Castaway (26/03/1999)
 10. A Strange Reunion  (02/04/1999)
 11. Not Quite Paradise (09/04/1999) (Note: This episode was nominated for Best Children's Television Program at the AFI awards in 1999)
 12. My Brother's Keeper (16/04/1999)
 13. Begin Again (23/04/1999) (Note: Final episode and the only one that was never released on video)

Home media

Video releases

Australia

DVD releases

Italy

References

External links
  (Theme Song)
 The Adventures of Sam- the Official Website
 
The Adventures of Sam at the National Film and Sound Archive
 

1999 Australian television series debuts
1999 Australian television series endings
1990s Australian animated television series
Australian children's animated action television series
Australian children's animated adventure television series
Australian children's animated drama television series
English-language television shows
Australian Broadcasting Corporation original programming
Television series by Endemol Australia
Australian preschool education television series